The European Futsal Association or European Union of Futsal (UEFS) was the international sporting association for futsal in Europe. Its name has been directly translated into many languages, and in English has been known as both the European Futsal Association and the European Union of Futsal. It was founded in 1985 in Madrid, then transferred to Moscow. UEFS was affiliated to the Asociación Mundial de Futsal (AMF) until 2017. However, UEFS was disaffiliated and Futsal European Federation was established to replace it.

Competitions

UEFS organized men's and women's tournaments for both national and club teams. In the women's area, the activity started in 2001. Club tournaments like men's have taken place since 2004.

National teams

UEFS Futsal Men's Championship
UEFS Futsal Women's Championship
UEFS Futsal Men's Under 21

The first competition organized was the European Championship that took place in Madrid in 1989. Now UEFS stages the European Championship biennially.

Clubs

UEFS Champions League
UEFS Cup
UEFS Veteran European Champions Cup
UEFS Women's European Champions Cup
UEFS Women's Cup

In 1991, UEFS organized the first tournament for club's teams: the European Champion Clubs’ Cup, which took place regularly every year in a different site, except for 2000. In 1995 this competition was put side by side by UEFS Cup that, after being occasional – 1995, 1997, 1998, 2000, later took place yearly.

External links 
Home page (archived)
Facebook page

Futsal organizations
Futsal
Futsal in Europe